Stretton Hall is a country house in the parish of Stretton in Shropshire, England.  It was built in about 1763 for John Leche.  The house is constructed in brick on a sandstone basement, with painted stone dressings, and a slate roof.  It has three symmetrical elevations.  The entrance front is in three two-storey bays with a single-storey wing on each side.  The central bay is canted, with five steps leading up to a doorway with a pediment. The windows are sashes.  The garden front has similar windows, other than the wings, each of which contains a Venetian window.  To the right of the house is attached a further wing, converted from the 17th-century stable of an earlier house.  The house and former stable area is recorded in the National Heritage List for England as a designated Grade II* listed building.  The sandstone garden walls are listed at Grade II.

See also

Grade II* listed buildings in Cheshire West and Chester
Listed buildings in Stretton, Cheshire West and Chester
Stretton Lower Hall
Stretton Old Hall

References

Houses completed in 1763
Country houses in Cheshire
Grade II* listed buildings in Cheshire
Grade II* listed houses